The Ambush of Tin-Hama took place during the Tuareg rebellion of 2012, on March 25, 2012, when a convoy of the Ganda Izo militia was ambushed by the MNLA.

The Battle
On March 25, 2012, while the city of Ansongo was threatened by the rebels, the Ganda Iso militia was tasked by the central Government to go to reinforce the Army there. During their trip to reach Ansongo, the militiamen were placed at the forefront with 13 vehicles. But, having arrived near a pond, 5 kilometers from Tin-Hama and 45 kilometers from Ansongo, the militiamen were ambushed by the MLNA rebels led by Mbarek Ag Akly. After the clash, the Ganda Izo claimed that its losses were six dead, including Amadou Seydou Diallo, leader of the militia, as well as five wounded, two of whom seriously. Malians estimated the rebel losses at 18 dead; however, a reinforcing mission  led by Alhousseyni Sali Barazi Toure founded the existence of 21 graves in the rebel side. In its statement, written by Bakaye Ag Hamed Ahmed, the MNLA states that 16 Malian soldiers were killed, including militia leader Amadou Diallo, another is taken prisoner and two vehicles full of ammunition were captured. The rebels also said that no Islamist fought with them. Both sides claimed victory, with the MNLA claiming thar the convoy was destroyed while Ganda Izo's militia claim that the Rebels had higher losses.

References

2012 in Mali
Tin-Hama
Menaka
History of Azawad
Tin-Hama